Bermeo may refer to:

 Bermeo, a town and municipality in Spain.
 Bermeo FT, a Spanish football team.
 Nancy Bermeo, an American political scientist.
 Luis Rodolfo Peñaherrera Bermeo (1936–2016), an Ecuadorian artist.